The Dogra Regiment is an infantry regiment of the Indian Army. The regiment traces its roots directly from the 17th Dogra Regiment of the British Indian Army. When transferred to the Indian Army like its sister regiments, the numeral prefix (in the case of the Dogra Regiment, 17) was removed. Units of the Dogra Regiment have fought in all conflicts that independent India has been engaged in, making it one of the most prestigious and most decorated regiments of the Indian Army.

History

The Dogra Rajputs, the inhabitants of 'Duggar' or Dogra land hail from the Indian states of Jammu and Kashmir, Himachal Pradesh and the hilly regions of Punjab. The Dogra Regiment traces its lineage to 1858, when the Agra Levy was raised by the British East India Company as part of the Bengal Army. The Dogras were added into the Bengal Army on the recommendation of Sir Fredrick Roberts, the then commander-in-chief of India, who decided to add a Dogra regiment because he was impressed by the loyalty and soldierly qualities of Dogra troops.The Agra Levy was later renamed the 38th Dogras. In 1887 the 37th (Dogra) Bengal Infantry was raised and later renamed the 37th (Prince of Wales's Own) Dogras. In 1900 the 41st (Dogra) Bengal Infantry was raised and also later renamed the 41st Dogras. In 1922 the Indian government reformed the army, moving from single battalion regiments to multi-battalion regiments. The 37th, 38th and 41st Dogras were all amalgamated into the 17th Dogra Regiment. It dropped '17th' from its title in 1945 and was allocated to India upon its independence in 1947.

The 38th Dogras served in the siege of Malakand in 1897 and during the First World War, served in Aden, Suez and Palestine during the battle of Megiddo. The 37th Dogras took part in the Chitral Expedition in 1895 and during the First World War, fought in the Second Battle of Kut and the capture of Baghdad as part of the 14th Indian Division. The 41st Dogras served in China from 1904 to 1908 as part of an international force, and then served on the Western Front and the Mesopotamia Campaign during World War I.

In 1949, Karan Singh, son of Maharaja Hari Singh, the last maharaja of the princely state of Jammu and Kashmir, was appointed Regent by his father. He wrote the Dogra Regiment's regimental song, 'Dikhi Lai Dogra Desh'.
 
Perhaps the best compliment given to the Dogras has come from Field Marshal Sir William Slim who wrote to them thus:

Formation
The regiment was formed in 1922 through the amalgamation of three separate regiments of Dogras into the 17th Dogra Regiment. They were:
1st Battalion – formerly the 37th (Prince of Wales's Own) Dogras 
2nd Battalion – formerly the 38th Dogras
3rd Battalion – formerly the 1st Battalion, 41st Dogras
10th (Training) Battalion – formerly the 2nd Battalion, 41st Dogras

The regiment has produced one Chief of Army Staff, Gen. Nirmal Chander Vij. Vij also served as the 10th Colonel-in-Chief of the Dogra Regiment and the Dogra Scouts.

Indo-Pakistani War of 1947–48

Pakistani raiders had besieged and reduced Skardu in early 1948. It was vital that Leh, the next likely target, be relieved before it was attacked by the raiders. Maj. Prithi Chand, along with a band of 40 volunteers from the 2nd battalion, Dogra Regiment, began a hazardous mid-winter ascent of the Zojila pass on 16 February 1948, with rifles and ammunition for the garrison. They reached Leh on 8 March, where an ad hoc force for defence was organised, followed soon by a Jammu and Kashmir State Forces detachment bringing additional weapons.

Sino-Indian War

A company from the 4th battalion fought in the battle of Walong in November 1962 and suffered significant casualties against a vastly numerically superior Chinese force.

Indo-Pakistani War of 1965

On September 2, 1965, the 3rd battalion, commanded by Lt. Col. R.B. Nair, was given the task to capture Point 7702 in Jammu and Kashmir. The brigade then planned two battalion attacks with the 2nd battalion, Sikh Regiment on the left to clear the Raja picket and the 3rd battalion, Dogra Regiment on the right to capture point 7702. The battalion left late in the evening on September 5, and successfully sneaked past Raja picket. The two leading companies were to assault from the left flank and cross the start line at 04:00 on September 6 under the able leadership of Maj. Greesh Chandra Verma and Capt. Gurdev Singh Bawa. B and C companies stormed point 7702 at 05:00 on September 6. After a fierce hand-to-hand and bunker-to-bunker fight, the enemy was uprooted from the strongly built defences and the post was captured by 05:45.

Maj. G.C. Verma was wounded in the head and refused to be evacuated. He breathed his last on seeing the success signal being fired from his pistol by Sub. Rattan Singh. Capt. G.S. Bawa, the other assaulting company commander was also wounded fatally while silencing an enemy MMG. The battalion lost two officers, one JCO and 14 ORs while 3 officers, 2 JCOs and 60 ORs were wounded in the battle. 39 men of enemy were killed and 5 were taken as POWs.

In recognition of this valour the battalion was awarded the battle honour Chand Tekri and theatre honour of Jammu and Kashmir 1965.

2nd battalion, Dogra Regiment led the famed OP Hill attack on Nov 2nd 1965, to capture a strategic location in Mendhar area of Jammu and Kashmir. This is regarded as one of the bloodiest battles fought by the Indian Army. Maj GS Pall led the Delta company up the steep and open hill towards Kala Pathar, a frontal attack under heavy machine gun and mortar fire, with the hillside strewn with landmines, followed by Charlie and Alpha companies. Meanwhile 7th Battalion of Sikh Regiment and 5th Battalion of Sikh Li Regiment troops flanked the enemy. Dogras suffered heavy casualties throughout the night but refused to withdraw, eventually meeting up with the Sikh and Sikh Li troops for the capture. Many awards were earned posthumously, including Officers, JCOs and Jawans. 2rd Dogras earned a Battle Honour for this famed battle. An impressive memorial stands at the site today commemorating the battle and the bravery of 2nd Dogras.

Indo-Pakistani War of 1971

On the eastern front, the 9th battalion was responsible for the fall of Suadih, a small village in East Pakistan that was a strong bastion of the Pakistan Army's most fortified position in the country. This led to the ultimate liberation of East Pakistan and a victory for the Indian Army. For this task, 9 Dogra was awarded the battle honour of Suadih.

The 5th battalion was posted in Asal Uttar, Punjab, where it was assigned to accord depth to the defences of Khem Karan.

Kargil War

The 5th battalion fought in the Kargil War to capture Tiger Hill.

UN Peacekeeping
The Dogra Regiment has not only contributed to the United Nations Peacekeeping Forces in the Gaza Strip, Korea, and the Congo, but has also contributed in providing various military observers in various peace keeping operation around the globe. The 1st, 3rd and 9th battalions have participated in UN peacekeeping missions.

Recruitment
Dogra regiment has a fixed class composition: 50 percent  from Himachal Pradesh, 25 percent from Jammu and Kashmir, and a balance from Hoshiarpur, SBS Nagar, Pathankot, and Rupnagar districts of Punjab. Enlisting in army is seen as honourable pursuit for Dogras; soldiering has not only become a substantial part of the economic structure of the Dogra hills, but created social and cultural traditions built on the people's association with the army.

Regimental Centre 
Initially, the Dogra battalions were raised in various different places by the British Indian Army, with each having their own depot. After the first World War, a common depot was formed, which was later termed the Training Battalion (later the 10th Battalion). In 1943, the Training Battalion ceased to exist and was renamed The Dogra Regimental Centre. After independence,  the regimental centre was established in Meerut, Uttar Pradesh in 1952. It was moved to Faizabad Cantonment, Uttar Pradesh, in June 1976, where it is currently located.

Units  

2nd Battalion - The Great Second
3rd Battalion – Mighty Third 
4th Battalion - Char Satara
5th Battalion – Five The Formidable 
6th Battalion - Soaring Six
7th Battalion - Unbeaten Seven
8th Battalion - Elite Eight
9th Battalion – Suadih Paltan 
10th Battalion- Shaktishali Dus
11th Battalion - Elite Eleven
12th Battalion – Towering Twelfth 
13th Battalion - Siramani
14th Battalion – Fabulous Fourteen
15th Battalion – Fighting Fifteenth 
16th Battalion – Sovereign Sixteen
17th Battalion – Smashing Seventeen 
18th Battalion – Ashok Chakra Paltan 
19th Battalion – Dynamic Nineteen
20th Battalion - Leaping Tigers 
21st Battalion - Roaring Twenty-one 
 Dogra Scouts
11 Rashtriya Rifles 
20 Rashtriya Rifles 
40 Rashtriya Rifles 
62 Rashtriya Rifles

The regiment also has 4 Territorial Army battalions.
112th Infantry Battalion (Territorial Army) (based at Jalandhar, Punjab)
153rd Infantry Battalion (Territorial Army) (based at Meerut, Uttar Pradesh)
159th Infantry Battalion (Territorial Army) (based at Thalela, Jammu and Kashmir)
133rd Infantry Battalion  (Territorial Army) (Ecological) (based at Shimla, Himachal Pradesh)

Other facts:
1st Battalion was transformed in 1981 into the 7th Battalion, Mechanised Infantry Regiment

The battalions have participated in various UN missions; the 3rd battalion have served in Korea, the 1st battalion has served in Congo, the 9th battalion has served in Gaza and the 5th battalion has served in Sierra Leone. The 3rd battalion was the first-ever battalion of the Indian Army to go on a UN mission.

The 4th battalion has the additional honour of being the first battalion of the Indian Army to be deployed on the Siachen Glacier.

Affiliations
In the year 1990 affiliations of Indian Navy ships were being done with the Indian Army Regiments, INS Ranvijay was affiliated with the Dogra Regiment in 1997. Apart from this, the Dogras are also affiliated with the Regiment of Artillery (14 Medium Regiment and 15 Medium Regiment).

Battle honours
Two battalions of the 17th Dogra Regiment (the 2nd and 3rd), also fought in the Malayan Campaign. After the Fall of Singapore, a large number of the captured troops later went on to join the Indian National Army.

Pre-independence
Combined battle honours of 37th (Prince of Wales's Own) Dogras, 38th Dogras, 41st Dogras:
World War I
La Bassée 1914
Festubert 1914–1915
Givenchy 1914
Neuve Chapelle
Aubers
France and Flanders 1914–15
Egypt 1915
Megiddo
Nablus
Palestine 1918
Tigris 1916
Kut al-Amara 1917
Wadi
El Hanna 
Baghdad
Mesopotamia 1915–18
Aden
Megiddo – 1918 
Nablus – 1918
Palestine – 1918
North-West Frontier 1915–1917
Afghanistan 1919

World War II
Kota Bharu
Malaya 1941–42
Singapore 1941–42  
Donbaik
Wrencat
Nunshigum
Magwe
Kennedy Peak
Burma 1942–45

Post-independence
Jhangar 1947
Barwali 1947
Rajauri 1947
Jammu and Kashmir 1947–48
Hajipir
Raja Picquet-Chand Tekri
OP Hill (NL 1053)
Tiger Hill-1999 
 Uri 
 Poonch 
Jammu and Kashmir 1965
Asal Uttar
Dograi
Punjab 1965
Suadhi
Siramani
Chauddagram
East Pakistan 1971
Ferozpur 
Dera Baba Nanak

Colonels of the Dogra Regiment

 Lieutenant General Kalwant Singh 
 Lieutenant General M.S. Pathania PVSM 
 Major General M.G. Hazari PVSM, AVSM 
 Major General Mohan Lal PVSM 
 Lieutenant General P.N. Hoon PVSM, AVSM, SM
 Lieutenant General V.K. Jetley PVSM, VSM 
 Lieutenant General V.K. Sood PVSM, AVSM, PhD 
 Lieutenant General Sher Amir Singh PVSM, AVSM 
 Lieutenant General H.S. Bedi PVSM, VSM
 Lieutenant General Surjit Singh PVSM, AVSM, VSM 
 General N.C. Vij PVSM, UYSM, AVSM, ADC 
 Lieutenant General S.S. Sanga PVSM, AVSM, VSM, SM
 Lieutenant General J.K. Mohanty PVSM, UYSM, AVSM, VSM, SM, ADC 
 Lieutenant General Jasbir Singh Dhaliwal PVSM, AVSM, VSM 
 Lieutenant General A.K. Singh PVSM, AVSM, VSM, SM
 Lieutenant General G.S. Dhillon PVSM, VSM, YSM, SM
 Brig Jagmohan Varma, SM, VSM
 Lieutenant General Ranbir Singh AVSM**, YSM, SM
 Lieutenant General Jai Singh Nain AVSM,SM

Gallantry Awards

Before Indian independence, the Dogras had to their credit two Victoria Crosses and 44 Military Crosses besides 312 other awards including 2 unit Citations. Some awardees are like :
 Brigadier John Alexander Sinton VC – 37th Dogras
 Lance Naik Lala VC – 41st Dogras
 Major R.C. Dunlop MC
 Major R.C. Christie MC
 Subedar Narsinghu MC 
 Lance Naik Janak Singh MC 
 Lieutenant Colonel Prithi Chand MVC 
 Brigadier Narinder Singh Sandhu MVC
 Capt Devinder Singh Ahlawat MVC
 Lieutenant Colonel Khushal Chand MVC 
 Major Sandeep Shankla AC
 Colonel K.J. Singh SC**, SM
 Honorary Captain Vijay Kumar Sharma Padma Shri, AVSM, SM
 Colonel Anil Kumar KC
 Sub. Major and Hony. Capt. Chhering Norbu Bodh, SC

The following battalions of the regiment have also been awarded the Chief of Army Staff's Unit Citation:
2nd Battalion 
5th Battalion (2 unit citations) 
7th Battalion
10th Battalion
14th Battalion
21st Battalion 
11 Rashtriya Rifles 
40 Rashtriya Rifles

References

External links
History of the Dogra Regiment
The Dogra Regiment – Bharat Rakshak
Commonwealth Regiments Site

D
British Indian Army infantry regiments
Military units and formations established in 1877
Dogra
1877 establishments in India